The Basque basketball derby, is the name given to the basketball matches between Baskonia from Vitoria-Gasteiz and Bilbao Basket from Bilbao, the two main basketball teams in the Basque Country. Both cities are only separated by 66 km.

History

First games
Since the dissolution of Cajabilbao in 1994, Baskonia was the only Basque team in the Liga ACB until Bilbao Basket, founded in 2003, achieved promotion to the Spanish top league in 2004.

The first match between both teams was played on 3 October 2004, in the first round of the 2004–05 ACB season, at Pabellón La Casilla. Baskonia won by a huge 57–104, the biggest loss ever received by Bilbao Basket. After a second defeat, Bilbao won its first derby on 22 January 2006, by 92–78.

On 6 January 2007, Bizkaia Arena registered the highest attendance to date for a Liga ACB game with 15,414 people in the 78–92 win by Baskonia.

Rise of the rivalry and cup games
As Bilbao Basket started to improve its level, the rivalry between both teams increased. On 29 September 2007, Baskonia won the Supercopa by defeating Bilbao at Bizkaia Arena by 73–85. One year later, both teams played the first derby in the 2008 Copa del Rey semifinal and Baskonia won again by a narrow 68–66.

First playoffs
In the 2009 ACB Playoffs both teams met in the quarterfinals. Baskonia the series by 2–0 and would repeat this result again in the 2012 edition.

Derbies at EuroLeague
Bilbao Basket qualified for the first time to the EuroLeague on 2011, after finishing as runner-up of the 2010–11 ACB season. As Spain had five teams in the competition, both teams were drawn in the same group. Bilbao Basket won both games and eliminated Baskonia in the game played at Bilbao Arena, where the Men in black won by 77–72. This was the first time Baskonia did not qualify for the Top16 in the modern era of the Euroleague. Bilbao advanced in the competition until the quarterfinals, where they were eliminated by CSKA Moscow.

Brawl at Bilbao Arena and decline of Bilbao Basket

On March 1, 2015, the derby finished with a brawl where Dejan Todorović of Bilbao and Tornike Shengelia of Baskonia were disqualified and twelve players were ejected due to court invasion during the fight.

With four seconds left and Bilbao winning by a huge margin, despite the referee's call for a travelling, Todorović was going to dunk when he was hit by Shengelia. After this, the Serbian player pushed Shengelia from behind and the Georgian forward reacted with a punch. After this, all the players who were in the bench came into the court and started the brawl. When Shengelia was leaving the court after the disqualifying foul, he apologized to a child who was in the first row of the arena.

The ACB announced this brawl would have severe consequences and sanctions and would talk with the Spanish Basketball Federation for changing the disciplinary regulations. On March 5, the league provisionally suspended Todorović and Shengelia until the final resolution of the case.

Both clubs claimed to have the same sanctions than in 2004, when the brawl Real Madrid and Estudiantes occurred. Finally, on March 11, the Disciplinary Judge accorded to suspend Tornike Shengelia for five games, Dejan Todorović for four and a €3,000 fine to Bilbao Basket player Dairis Bertāns and to Baskonia brothers Mamadou and Ilimane Diop.

On 13 May 2018, Baskonia won a derby at Bilbao Arena by 78–74, thus relegating Bilbao Basket to the LEB Oro after 14 consecutive years in the top league. Bilbao returned to Liga ACB at the first opportunity, earning immediate promotion with a second-place finish in the 2018–19 LEB Oro season.

Head-to-head statistics

Results

At ACB Regular season

At ACB playoffs

At Copa del Rey

At Supercopa

At EuroLeague

See also
Basque derby (football)

References

External links
Vitoria-Bilbao rivalry at Proyecto 75ers 
Baskonia official website
Bilbao Basket official website

Basketball rivalries
Sport in Vitoria-Gasteiz
Sport in Bilbao
Bilbao Basket
Saski Baskonia